This is a list of Belgian television related events from 1985.

Events

Debuts

Television shows

1980s
Tik Tak (1981-1991)

Ending this year

Births
22 October - Hadise, singer & TV personality

Deaths